The Reprise Collection is a 1990 box set by the American singer Frank Sinatra.

Released to coincide with Sinatra's 75th birthday, this four-disc set has an abundance of classic Sinatra performances from his career with Reprise Records. A single disc version called Sinatra Reprise: The Very Good Years was released in 1991, which highlighted Sinatra's best known songs.

Track listing

Disc one
"Let's Fall in Love" (Harold Arlen, Ted Koehler) - 2:11
"You'd Be So Easy to Love" (Cole Porter) - 2:24
"The Coffee Song (They've Got An Awful Lot of Coffee in Brazil)" (Bob Hilliard, Dick Miles) - 2:51
"Zing! Went the Strings of My Heart" (James F. Hanley) - 2:48
"The Last Dance" (Sammy Cahn, Jimmy Van Heusen) - 2:46
"The Second Time Around" (Cahn, Van Heusen) – 3:03
"Tina" (Cahn, Van Heusen) - 2:54
"Without a Song" (Vincent Youmans, Billy Rose, Edward Eliscu) – 3:39
"It Started All Over Again" (Carl T. Fischer, Bill Carey) – 2:32
"Love Walked In" (George Gershwin, Ira Gershwin) – 2:19
"You're Nobody till Somebody Loves You" (James Cavanaugh, Russ Morgan, Larry Stock) – 4:09
"Don't Take Your Love from Me" (Henry Nemo) - 4:05
"Come Rain or Come Shine" (Arlen, Johnny Mercer) – 4:06
"Night and Day" (Porter) – 3:37
"All Alone" (Irving Berlin) – 2:42
"What'll I Do?" (Berlin) – 3:15
"I Get a Kick Out of You" (Porter) – 3:14
"Don'cha Go 'Way Mad" (Jimmy Mundy, Al Stillman, Illinois Jacquet) – 3:12
"A Garden in the Rain" (James Dyrenforth, Carroll Gibbons) – 3:24
"A Nightingale Sang in Berkeley Square" (Eric Maschwitz, Manning Sherwin) – 3:54
"Please Be Kind" (Saul Chaplin, Cahn)  – 2:43

Disc two
"Pennies from Heaven" (Johnny Burke, Arthur Johnston) - 3:27
"Me And My Shadow" [with Sammy Davis Jr.] (Dave Dreyer, Al Jolson, Billy Rose) - 3:06
"I Have Dreamed" (Oscar Hammerstein II, Richard Rodgers) - 2:57
"America the Beautiful" (Katherine Lee Bates, Samuel Ward) - 2:21
"California" (Cahn, Van Heusen) – 3:37
"Soliloquy" (Hammerstein, Rodgers) - 8:06
"Luck Be a Lady" (Frank Loesser) - 5:14
"Here's to the Losers" (Jack Segal, Robert Wells) - 3:04
"The Way You Look Tonight" (Jerome Kern, Dorothy Fields) - 3:22
"My Kind of Town" (Cahn, Van Heusen) - 3:08
"The Best Is Yet to Come" (Cy Coleman, Carolyn Leigh) - 2:54
"Fly Me To The Moon" (Bart Howard) - 2:49
"September Song" (Maxwell Anderson, Kurt Weill) - 3:30
"It Was a Very Good Year" (Ervin Drake) - 4:27
"This Is All I Ask" (Gordon Jenkins) - 3:03
"I'll Only Miss Her When I Think of Her" (Cahn, Van Heusen) - 2:51
"Love and Marriage" (Cahn, Van Heusen) - 2:12
"Moonlight Serenade" (Glenn Miller, Mitchell Parish)  – 3:26
"I Wished on the Moon" (Dorothy Parker, Ralph Rainger)- 2:53
"Oh, You Crazy Moon" (Burke, Van Heusen) - 3:13

Disc three
"I've Got You Under My Skin"  (Porter)  – 3:43
"The Shadow of Your Smile" (Johnny Mandel, Paul Francis Webster)  – 2:31
"Street of Dreams" (Victor Young, Samuel Lewis)  – 2:16
"You Make Me Feel So Young" (Mack Gordon, Joe Myrow)  – 3:21 
Recorded live at the Sands Hotel, January–February, 1966
"Strangers in the Night" (Bert Kaempfert, Charles Singleton, Eddie Snyder)  – 2:25
"Summer Wind" (Heinz Meier, Hans Bradtke, Mercer)  – 2:53
"All or Nothing at All" (Arthur Altman, Jack Lawrence) – 3:57
"That's Life" (Kelly Gordon, Dean Kay)  – 3:10
"I Concentrate on You" (Porter) – 2:32
"Dindi" (Ray Gilbert, Antonio Carlos Jobim, Aloysio de Oliveria) – 3:25
"Once I Loved (O Amor em Paz)" (Jobim, Gilbert, Vinícius de Moraes)  – 2:37
"How Insensitive (Insensatez)" (Jobim, Norman Gimbel, de Moraes) – 3:15
"Drinking Again" (Mercer, Doris Tauber) – 3:13
"Somethin' Stupid" [with Nancy Sinatra] (Carson Parks) – 2:45 	
"All I Need Is the Girl" (Stephen Sondheim, Jule Styne)  – 5:01
"Indian Summer" (Victor Herbert, Al Dubin)  – 4:14
"My Way" (Paul Anka, Claude François, Jacques Revaux, Gilles Thibault)  – 4:35
"Wave" (Jobim)  – 3:25
"A Man Alone" (Rod McKuen) - 3:47
"Forget to Remember" (Victoria Pike, Teddy Randazzo) - 2:58

Disc four
"There Used to Be a Ballpark" (Joe Raposo)  – 3:34
"What Are You Doing the Rest of Your Life?" (Alan Bergman, Marilyn Bergman, Michel Legrand) – 4:05
"Just as Though You Were Here" (John Benson Brooks, Eddie DeLange)  - 4:22
"The Lady Is a Tramp" (Rodgers, Hart)  - 2:56 
Recorded live at Madison Square Garden, October 13, 1974
"Empty Tables" (Van Heusen, Mercer)  - 2:48
"Send in the Clowns" (Sondheim)  - 3:36
"I Love My Wife" (Coleman, Michael Stewart)  - 3:10
"Nancy (With the Laughing Face)" (Phil Silvers, Van Heusen)  - 2:28
"Emily" (Johnny Mandel, Mercer)  - 3:00
"Sweet Lorraine" (Cliff Burwell, Mitchell Parish)  - 2:22
"My Shining Hour" (Arlen, Mercer)  - 3:23
"More Than You Know" (Eliscu, Rose, Youmans)  - 3:25
"The Song Is You" (Hammerstein, Kern)  - 2:40
"Theme from New York, New York" (Fred Ebb, John Kander)  - 3:26
"Something" (George Harrison)  - 4:43
Medley: "The Gal That Got Away"/"It Never Entered My Mind" (Arlen, I. Gershwin)/(Rodgers, Hart)  - 5:50
"A Long Night"  (Alec Wilder, Loonis McGlohon)  - 3:44
"Here's to the Band" (Sharman Howe, Alfred Nittoli, Artie Schroeck)  - 4:09
"It's Sunday" (Susan Birkenhead, Styne)  - 3:26
"Mack the Knife" (Marc Blitzstein, Bertolt Brecht, Kurt Weill)  - 4:52

Personnel
Frank Sinatra - vocals
Nancy Sinatra
Sammy Davis Jr.
Antonio Carlos Jobim - vocals, guitar
Don Costa - arranger, conductor
Ernie Freeman
Neal Hefti
Gordon Jenkins
Quincy Jones
Skip Martin
Billy May
Sy Oliver
Marty Paich
Nelson Riddle
Felix Slatkin
Torrie Zito
Morris Stoloff
Count Basie and his orchestra
Woody Herman and his orchestra

References

1990 compilation albums
Frank Sinatra compilation albums
Reprise Records compilation albums